A punnet is a small box or square basket for the gathering, transport and sale of fruit and vegetables, typically for small berries susceptible to bruising, spoiling and squashing that are therefore best kept in small rigid containers. Punnets serve also as a rough measure for a quantity of irregular sized fruits.

Etymology 
The word is largely confined to Commonwealth countries (but not Canada) and is of uncertain origin, but is thought to be a diminutive of 'pun,''' a British dialect word for pound, from the days in which such containers were used as a unit of measurement. The Oxford Dictionary of National Biography, parenthetically in its entry for geneticist R. C. Punnett (1875–1967), credits "a strawberry growing ancestor [who] devised the wooden basket known as a 'punnet.'"

History and description

 Prior form 
In the late eighteenth century, strawberries and some soft fruit were sold in pottles, conical woodchip baskets (see illustration, right), the tapering shape being thought to reduce damage to fruit at the bottom. The pottle used in England and Scotland at that time contained nominally one Scottish pint. They were stacked, fifty or sixty together, into square hampers for transport to the market, placed upon a woman's head on a small cushion and over longer distances in a light carriage of frame work hung on springs.

The Saturday Magazine in 1834 records 'pottle baskets' being made by women and children in their homes for six pence a dozen by steeping the cut wood in water, and splitting it into strips of dimensions needed for each part of the basket. The most skilful weavers formed the upright supports of the basket, fixing them in their place by weaving the bottom part. Children wove the sides with pliable strips of fir or willow.

 Development 
Pottles were replaced in the mid-1800s by the more practical rectangular punnet. The terms 'pottle' and 'punnet' were often used interchangeably. As reported in an 1879 issue of The Gentleman's Magazine, the conical pottle had given way to the punnet, being mainly manufactured in Brentford of deal, or the more preferred willow, by hundreds of women and children.

 Purpose 
A 1852 publication lists other produce being sold in punnets in British markets, including sea kale, mushrooms, small salad and tomatoes.

Punnets are used for collecting berries as well as for selling them, thus reducing handling of the fragile fruits and the likely damage that it could cause. The process is recorded in a 1948 poem by New Zealand author Mabel Christmas-Harvey;
Knees are aching, backs are breaking
Ladies fair who eat our spoils
Have you ever 'midst enjoyment
Realised our painful toils?

Forty, fifty in a punnet,
Each one picked by hand with care,
For a penny paid each punnet...
Thus you get your dainty fare.

 North America 
In North America, commercial strawberry horticulture began around 1820, and the fruits were packed in the same manner as that approved by English gardeners; in 1821 it was recommended that Massachusetts strawberry growers carry berries to the Boston markets in "pottles, that is, in inverted cones of basket work.” The English punnet used in the strawberry trade of New York City between 1815 and 1850 was a round shallow basket of woven wickerwork without handles. A handled punnet became more popular in the New York market, as related in the Proceedings of the New Jersey Horticultural Society'' by Charles W. Idell, who resided in Hoboken and managed a produce market at the foot of Barclay Street, New York:

Manufacture 
A 1903 work describes the construction of punnets;

By 1969, punnets in the United Kingdom were being made out of thinly lathed poplar wood peelers, using a semi-mechanical system. While factory workers still had to interlace the laths, metal staples were used to fix the strips.

Present-day forms 
Contemporary punnets are generally made in a variety of dimensions of semi-rigid, transparent, lightweight PET plastic with lockable lids, or of clamshell design, and with vents. Their advantage is that they permit visual examination by the consumer but discourage physical contact with the merchandise at point of sale.

As early as 1911, cardboard punnets with wire handles were being used, and increasingly, moulded pulp and corrugated fiberboard are being used, as they are perceived to be more sustainable materials. Decorative punnets are often made of felt and seen in flower and craft arrangements.

References

Containers
Packaging
Fruit production
Handicrafts
Food packaging
 
Food storage containers